Bretejovce is a village and municipality in Prešov District in the Prešov Region of eastern Slovakia.

History
The village was first mentioned in historical records in 1289. Before 1918, it was part of Sáros county in Austria-Hungary.

Geography
The municipality lies at an altitude of 239 metres and covers an area of  (2020-06-30/-07-01). It lies on the western bank of the Torysa (river).

Demographics
In 1787, the village had 37 houses and 323 inhabitants. In 1828, 50 houses and 383 inhabitants. In 1900, there were 351 residents. As of 31 December 2011, the village had a population of 384 people.

Landmarks
Bretejovce's Roman Catholic church, The Seven Sorrows of Mary or, Our Lady of Sorrows,, was built in the baroque style in 1785, and sits at the top of a hill at the end of the main side street in the village. The church is part of the Budimir parish, and part of the Košice archdiocese. The village's coat of arms incorporates the symbol for the Seven Sorrows of Mary, seven swords piercing a heart.

See also
 List of municipalities and towns in Slovakia

References

Genealogical resources

The records for genealogical research are available at the state archive "Statny Archiv in Kosice, Slovakia"

 Roman Catholic church records (births/marriages/deaths): 1747-1896 (parish B)
 Greek Catholic church records (births/marriages/deaths): 1819-1898 (parish B)
 Lutheran church records (births/marriages/deaths): 1787-1895 (parish B)

External links
 
 
https://web.archive.org/web/20110226112651/http://app.statistics.sk/mosmis/eng/run.html
Surnames of living people in Bretejovce

Villages and municipalities in Prešov District
Šariš